The 2021 All-Australian team represents the best performed Australian Football League (AFL) players during the 2021 season. It was announced on 26 August as a complete Australian rules football team of 22 players. The team is honorary and does not play any games.

Selection panel
The selection panel for the 2021 All-Australian team consisted of chairman Gillon McLachlan, Kevin Bartlett, Jude Bolton, Andrew Dillon, Glen Jakovich, Chris Johnson, Cameron Ling, Matthew Richardson, Nick Riewoldt and Warren Tredrea.

Team

Initial squad
The initial 40-man All-Australian squad was announced on 21 August. Minor premiers  had the most players selected in the initial squad with seven, while the  had five. Seven players from the 2020 team were among those selected.

Final team
Melbourne had the most selections with five, with twelve clubs represented overall. Melbourne captain Max Gawn was announced as the All-Australian captain, with  captain Marcus Bontempelli announced as vice-captain. The team saw eleven players selected in an All-Australian team for the first time in their careers, while seven players from the 2020 team were among those selected.

Note: the position of coach in the All-Australian team is traditionally awarded to the coach of the premiership team.

References

All-Australian team